The Baptistery of San Giovanni an octagonal thirteenth-century religious building standing just in front of the Duomo of Volterra, in the center of the city. It was supposedly set up in the seventh century at the site of a Roman temple dedicated to Sun worship.

The façade is decorated with horizontal bands of white and dark green marble. The Romanesque Portal has been attributed to a follower of Nicola Pisano. The sixteenth-century altar inside has been assigned to Balsimelli da Settignano, using a design by Mino da Fiesole. It has a painting (partially damaged during World War Two of the Assumption of the Virgin by Niccolò Circignani. Beside that altar is a  marble font (1502) is by Andrea Sansovino. The Ciborium (1471) was completed by Mino da Fiesole. The baptismal font (1759) by Giovanni Vaccà. Above it rises a statue of St John the Baptist (1771) by  Giovanni Antonio Cybei. The holy water receptacle is an ancient Roman sarcophagus.

References

Catholic baptisteries
13th-century Roman Catholic church buildings in Italy
Roman Catholic churches in Volterra
Romanesque architecture in Tuscany
Baptisteries in Italy